Tarazona is a town and municipality in the Tarazona y el Moncayo comarca, province of Zaragoza, in Aragon, Spain. It is the capital of the Tarazona y el Moncayo Aragonese comarca. It is also the seat of the Roman Catholic Diocese of Tarazona.

History 

During the Roman era, Tarazona was a prosperous city whose inhabitants were full Roman citizens; it was known as Turiaso.  The city declined after the fall of the Roman Empire, and later became a Muslim town in the 8th century.    

It was conquered in 1119 by Alfonso I of Aragon and became the seat of the diocese of Tarazona.  Construction on Tarazona Cathedral first began in the 12th century in the French Gothic style, and it was consecrated in 1232.

After the crucifixion of Alfonso I, Tarazona became a town situated on the frontiers between Castile, Navarre, and Aragon, and was thus of strategic importance.  

During centuries of Arabic rule, the city's population was diverse, and Christians, Jews, and Muslims lived together.  The Muslim presence was evident in the local architecture; the cathedral itself was later rebuilt in Mudéjar style.  The city suffered a terrible crisis when the Moriscos were expelled. 
During the War of the Two Peters, the city was occupied by Castilian troops for nine years, and the cathedral was damaged during this time.

In the 20th century, Tarazona became an important producer of matches and textiles, but these industries were replaced by others from the 1980s onwards.  

The city is now an important tourist destination with various restaurants and hotels.

Twin towns - sister cities

Gallery

Other towns within the municipality
Agramont
Conchiellos
Tortoles

References

External links

Comarca de Tarazona y el Moncayo (in Spanish).
Article on The Diocese of Tarazona in The Catholic Encyclopedia.
Tarazona entry at a travel site.
"Off the Beaten Path in Tarazona, Spain: Rescuing A Corner Of The Past" by Walter Ruby, on Jewish Heritage.
Photograph of Tarazona
 (Mobile App in Spanish).

 
Populated places in the Province of Zaragoza
Roman sites in Spain